The Ambassador of the United Kingdom to Venezuela is the United Kingdom's foremost diplomatic representative to Venezuela, and in charge of the UK's diplomatic mission in Venezuela. The official title is His Britannic Majesty's Ambassador to the Bolivarian Republic of Venezuela.

List of heads of mission

 1825–1835: Sir Robert Ker Porter, Consul at Caracas
 1835–1841: Sir Robert Ker Porter, Chargé d'Affaires and Consul General
 1841–1843: Sir Daniel Florence O'Leary, Acting Consul General
 February 1858: Sir Philip Edmund Wodehouse, Special Mission to Caracas

Chargé d'Affaires and Consul-General to the Republic of Venezuela
 1842–1858: Belford Hinton Wilson
 1858–1864: Frederic Doveton Orme
 1864–1865: Hon. Richard Edwardes

Chargé d'Affaires and Consul-General to the United States of Venezuela
 1865–1869: George Fagan
 1869–1873: Robert Thomas Charles Middleton

Minister Resident and Consul-General to the United States of Venezuela
 1873–1878: Robert Thomas Charles Middleton

Minister Resident to the United States of Venezuela
 1878–1881: Robert Bunch
 1881–1884: Charles Edward Mansfield

Minister Resident to the Republic of Venezuela
 1884–1887: Frederick Robert St John
 1887–1897: Diplomatic relations severed over Guayana Esequiba

Minister Resident at Carácas
 1897–1902: William Henry Doveton Haggard
 1902–1907: Henry Bax-Ironside
 1908–1911: Sir Vincent Edwin Henry Corbett

Minister Resident to the United States of Venezuela
 1911–1913: Frederic Dundas Harford

Envoy Extraordinary and Minister Plenipotentiary to the United States of Venezuela
 1913–1916: Frederic Dundas Harford
 1916–1923: Henry Beaumont 
 1923–1925: Andrew Percy Bennett
 1925–1926: William Seeds
 1926–1932: William Edmund O'Reilly
 1932–1936: Edward Allis Keeling
 1936–1939: Sir Ernest Frederick Gye
 1939–1944: Donald St Clair Gainer

Ambassador Extraordinary and Plenipotentiary to the Republic of Venezuela
 1944–1948: Sir George Ogilvie-Forbes
 1948–1951: Sir John Magowan
 1951–1955: Sir Robert Urquhart
 1955–1961: John Walker
 1961–1964: Sir Douglas Busk
 1964–1969: Anthony Lincoln
 1969–1973: Sir Donald Hopson
 1973–1975: Sir Lees Mayall
 1975–1979: Sir Jock Taylor
 1979–1982: Reginald Secondé
 1982–1985: Hugh Carless CMG
 1985–1988: Michael Newington CMG
 1988–1994: Giles FitzHerbert CMG
 1994–1997: John Flynn CMG
 1997–2000: Richard Wilkinson CVO
 2000–2003: Dr John Hughes
 2003–2006: Donald Lamont
 2006–2007: Susan Jane Breeze, chargé d'affaires from Dec 2006 until Jan 2007
 2007–2010: Catherine Royle
 2010–2014: Catherine Nettleton OBE

 2014–: John Saville

References

External links
 UK and Venezuela. gov.uk

Venezuela
 
United Kingdom